Lubbon is a commune in the Landes department in Nouvelle-Aquitaine in south-western France.

See also
Communes of the Landes department

References

Communes of Landes (department)